William J. Brennan, Jr., who authored the opinion in New York Times Co. v. Sullivan, has several awards named in his honor, which are presented to individuals for dedication to public interest and free expression.  Awards named after William J. Brennan, Jr. are  presented by the following organizations.

Thomas Jefferson Center for the Protection of Free Expression
The William J. Brennan, Jr. Award honors the legacy of U. S. Supreme Court Justice Brennan's extraordinary devotion to the principles of free expression. The award recognizes an individual or group whose commitment to free expression is consistent with Justice Brennan's abiding devotion. Such commitment might be shown by a single act or through a lifetime of activity to enhance the liberties of free speech and press.

The award is given not more than once a year or less than once in five years. Honorees receive $5000.00 at a ceremony in Washington, D.C. and have their name inscribed on a plaque on display in Justice Brennan's chambers in the United States Supreme Court. Nominees from all professions and backgrounds are considered and nominations from the general public are invited.

District of Columbia Bar
The honor is presented biannually to a DC Bar member in recognition of "outstanding work toward furthering the public interest and equal justice." Edelman, an expert in poverty, welfare, juvenile justice and constitutional law, received the honor at the Bar's annual awards dinner on June 23.

International Commission of Jurists
The Brennan Award, made possible again this year by a generous grant from the Paul D. Schurgot Foundation, is presented to a non-American lawyer or judge who has made a notable contribution toward establishing or defending human rights and the rule of law.

Association of the Federal Bar of the State of New Jersey
William J. Brennan, Jr., Award. The Award, which is given annually by the Association of the Federal Bar of the State of New Jersey, honors those whose actions have advanced the principles of free expression. Judge Becker spent many years as a member of the ALI-ABA Committee and is a member of the Institute’s Special Committee on Federal Judicial Code Revision.

Recipients:
 1977 – Hon. Joseph Weintraub
Chief Justice of the New Jersey Supreme Court
 1978 – Hon. Worral F. Mountain
Associate Justice of the New Jersey Supreme Court
 1979 – Hon. Richard J. Hughes
Governor of New Jersey and Chief Justice of the New Jersey Supreme Court
 1979 – Clifford P. Case
United States Senator
 1980 – Hon. William H. Webster
Director of the Federal Bureau of Investigation; Former Judge of the United States Court of Appeals for the Eighth Circuit
 1981 – Hon. Albert B. Maris
Judge of the United States Court of Appeals for the Third Circuit
 1982 – Hon. Nicolas deB. Katzenbach
Attorney General of the United States
 1983 – Hon. Robert N. Wilentz
Chief Justice of the New Jersey Supreme Court
 1984 – Hon. Morris Pashman
Associate Justice of the New Jersey Supreme Court
 1985 – Hon. Collins J. Seitz
Chief Judge of the United States Court of Appeals for the Third Circuit
 1986 – Hon. Frederick B. Lacey
United States Attorney and Judge of the United States District Court for the District of New Jersey
 1987 – Hon. Herbert J. Stern
United States Attorney and Judge of the United States District Court for the District of New Jersey
 1988 – Hon. Mitchell H. Cohen
Senior Judge of the United States District Court for the District of New Jersey
 1988 – Hon. Leonard I. Garth
Senior Judge of the United States Court of Appeals for the Third Circuit
 1988 – Hon. James Hunter, III
Senior Judge of the United States Court of Appeals for the Third Circuit
 1989 – Hon. Clarkson S. Fisher
Senior Judge of the United States District Court for the District of New Jersey
 1989 – William J. Brennan, III, Esq.
 1990 – Hon. John J. Gibbons
Chief Judge of the United States Court of Appeals for the Third Circuit
 1991 – Hon. John F. Gerry
Chief Judge of the United States District Court for the District of New Jersey
 1992 – Thomas F. Campion, Esq.
 1993 – Hon. A. Leon Higginbotham
Former Chief Judge of the United States Court of Appeals for the Third Circuit
 1994 – Hon. David H. Souter
Associate Justice of the United States Supreme Court
 1995 – Hon. Harold A. Ackerman
Senior Judge of the United States District Court for the District of New Jersey
 1995 – Hon. Stanley S. Brotman
Senior Judge of the United States District Court for the District of New Jersey
 1995 – Hon. Dickinson R. Debevoise
Senior Judge of the United States District Court for the District of New Jersey
 1996 – Hon. Robert L. Clifford
Retired Associate Justice of the New Jersey Supreme Court
 1997 – Hon. Sidney M. Schreiber
Retired Associate Justice of the New Jersey Supreme Court
 1997 – William B. McGuire, Esq.
 1998 – Rev. Daniel A. Degnan, S.J.
Former Dean of the Seton Hall University School of Law
 1998 – Hon. Herman D. Michels
Retired New Jersey Superior Court Judge
 1999 – Hon. Robert E. Cowen
Judge of the United States Court of Appeals for the Third Circuit
 1999 – Hon. Joseph H. Rodriguez
Judge of the United States District Court for the District of New Jersey 
 2000 – Hon. Maryanne Trump Barry
Judge of the United States Court of Appeals for the Third Circuit
 2000 – John J. Barry, Esq.
 2001 – Hon. Anne E. Thompson
Senior Judge of the United States District Court for the District of New Jersey
 2001 – Hon. Morton I. Greenberg
Senior Judge of the United States Court of Appeals for the Third Circuit
 2001 – Hon. Alfred M. Wolin
Senior Judge of the United States District Court for the District of New Jersey
 2002 – Hon. John C. Lifland
Senior Judge of the United States District Court for the District of New Jersey
 2002 – Hon. Nicholas H. Politan
Retired Judge of the United States District Court for the District of New Jersey 
 2002 – Raymond A. Brown, Esq.
 2003 – Donald A. Robinson, Esq.
 2003 – Justin P. Walder, Esq.
 2004 – Hon. Edward R. Becker
Senior Judge of the United States Court of Appeals for the Third Circuit
 2004 – Frederic K. Becker, Esq.
 2005 – Hon. John W. Bissell
Chief Judge of the United States District Court for the District of New Jersey
 2005 – Hon. Joseph E. Irenas 
Senior Judge of the United States District Court for the District of New Jersey
 2006 – Hon. William C. Bassler
United States District Court for the District of New Jersey
 2006 – Hon. William H. Walls
United States District Court for the District of New Jersey
 2007 – Hon. Marie L. Garibaldi
Retired Justice of the New Jersey Supreme Court
 2007 – Hon. Daniel J. O’Hern
Retired Justice of the New Jersey Supreme Court
 2008 – Hon. James R. Zazzali
Retired Chief Justice of the New Jersey Supreme Court
 2008 – Jonathan L. Goldstein, Esq.
 2009 – Hon. John J. Hughes
Retired Magistrate Judge for the District Court for the District of New Jersey
 2009 – Bruce I. Goldstein, Esq.
 2010 – Hon. Garrett E. Brown, Jr.
Chief Judge of the United States District Court for the District of New Jersey
 2010 – Michael R. Griffinger, Esq.
 2011 – Thomas R. Curtin, Esq.
 2011 – Hon. Katharine S. Hayden
Senior Judge of the United States District Court for the District of New Jersey
 2012 – John J. Farmer, Jr., Esq.
 2012 – Carl D. Poplar, Esq.
 2013 – Hon. Rosemary Gambardella
United States District Court for the District of New Jersey
 2013 – Theodore V. Wells, Jr., Esq.
 2014 – Hon. Dennis M. Cavanaugh
Retired Judge of the United States District Court for the District of New Jersey
 2014 – Joseph A. Hayden, Jr., Esq.
 2015 – Hon. Joseph A. Greenaway, Jr.
Judge of the United States Court of Appeals for the Third Circuit
 2015 – Lawrence S. Lustberg, Esq.

 2016 - Hon. Jerome B. Simandle

Chief Judge of the United States District Court for the District of New Jersey

 2016 - Hon. Stuart Rabner

Chief Justice of the Supreme Court of New Jersey

 2017 - Hon. Paul J. Fishman

United States Attorney for the District of New Jersey

 2018 - Hon. Michael A. Chagares

Judge of the United States Court of Appeals for the Third Circuit

 2019 - Hon. Stanley R. Chesler

United States District Judge for the District of New Jersey

 2019 - Joseph P. LaSala, Esq.

National Trial Advocacy College at the University of Virginia School of Law.
With Justice Brennan's agreement and participation, the National Trial Advocacy College at the University of Virginia School of Law established the William J. Brennan, Jr. Award in 1987. The Brennan Award honors Justice Brennan's unsurpassed contributions to the United States legal system and, in particular, to the enhancement of trial advocacy skills. The honorees--judges, public officials, and private practitioners--are selected on the basis of 1) their outstanding skills as trial lawyers and members of the judiciary, and 2) their outstanding contributions to advocacy education and to the legal profession. An engraved pewter bowl is given to each recipient.

These persons have received the Brennan Award:

1987: Judah Best, Robert R. Merhige, Jr., Herbert J. Stern; 1988: Charles L. Becton, James D. StClair, Stephen A. Salzburg; 1989: William J. Brennan, III, Terence F. MacCarthy; 1990: John J. Curtin, Bruce I. Goldstein; 1991: Frederic N. Smalkin, Gregory P. Joseph, Peter J. Kenny; 1992: Thomas F. Campion, Stephen M. Duncan; 1993:  James T. Turner, John C. Lowe; 1994: James M. Brown, Barry I. Fredericks, Charles B. Gorham; 1995: Ralph Adam Fine, Colin J.S. Thomas, Jr.; 1996: Raymond M. Tierney, Mary Lynn Tate, Edward R. Slaughter, Jr.; 1997: Stephen B. Farmer, Norman K. Moon; 1998: Stephen H. Helvin, Gerald A. Messerman; 1999: Helen S. Balick, Bernard Balick, Robert M. Taylor; 2000: Michael R. Fontham, B. Waugh Crigler; 2001: BrianJ. Donato, Arthur J. Schwab; 2002: David Boies, Gerald F. Ivey; 2003: James J. Brosnahan, David G. Lowe, Clifford R. Weckstein; 2004: Antonin G. Scalia; 2005: Peter Hill Beer, Adrian G. DuPlantier; 2006: Benjamin R. Civiletti, Peter J. Neufeld; 2007: Leonie M. Brinkema, Robert A. Clifford, Jo-Ellen Dimitrius; 2008: Barbara J. Rothstein, Theodore V. Wells, Jr., Kenneth R. Feinberg; 2009: Mortimer M. Caplin, Julian Abele Cook, Jr.; 2010: Otto F. Feil, III, Kathy L. Nusslock; 2011: Liam O'Grady; 2012: Russell E. Carparelli, Ricardo M. Urbina.

See also

William O. Douglas Prize

References

Free expression awards
Human rights awards
Humanitarian and service awards
Legal awards